During the 1960–61 English football season, Brentford competed in the Football League Third Division. An abundance of draws led to a 17th-place finish and it was the last of seven seasons to feature the "Terrible Twins" strike partnership of Jim Towers and George Francis.

Season summary 
Despite making something of a name for themselves as the "nearly men" of the Third Division, manager Malky MacDonald made few changes to the Brentford squad for the fourth-consecutive off-season. The one major change at Brentford was that of the club's traditional red and white-striped shirts, which were passed over in favour of an amber shirt with a blue 'V' neck, due to the number of times the club would be forced to wear its change strip during the season. Negative feedback from the supporters ensured that the change of colours was a one-season experiment.

Brentford started the 1960–61 season well and topped the table after winning the first two matches, but a 6–1 defeat to Watford at Vicarage Road on 30 August 1960 shook the team's confidence. The same XI atoned for that display with a 4–0 victory over Shrewsbury Town four days later, but the view had become prevalent around Griffin Park that some of Brentford's settled XI were past their peak. Manager MacDonald tinkered with his squad and bit-part, reserve or youth players Tommy Higginson, John Docherty, Ron Peplow and Johnny Hales were given runs in the team. Amidst a run of just two wins in 19 league matches, the new Football League Cup gave the Bees some cheer when Second Division club Sunderland were defeated 4–3 at Griffin Park in the club's first-ever match in the competition. The Bees were knocked out after a replay versus reigning Football League champions Burnley in the third round. A first round exit in the FA Cup in November ensured that the Third Division would be Brentford's sole focus for the remainder of the season.

Brentford entered 1961 in 15th place in the Third Division, only three points above the relegation zone. Chairman Frank Davis posted a £7,000 loss, which took the club's debt over £50,000 and a players' strike (in support of their claim for the removal of the maximum wage) was also a real possibility. In a bid to alleviate some of the club's debt, promising outside right John Docherty was sold to Sheffield United for a club record £17,000 in March 1961. The club rallied and lost just five of the remaining 21 matches of the season, but a failure to convert the 11 draws into wins (four consecutive home draws in February and March equalled the club record) ensured that Brentford finished in a lowly 17th place. Brentford's final match of the season versus Reading, although won 2–1, pushed the average league attendance at Griffin Park down to 7,392, which was the club's lowest since the 1924–25 season.

The "Terrible Twins" (forwards Jim Towers and George Francis) had a mixed season, with Towers scoring 22 goals (low by the standards set for himself) and Francis just 10, which led to him being dropped from the team in February 1961 – a decision which would have been considered unthinkable just six months earlier. Despite scoring 13 goals in 10 matches for the reserve team, Francis failed to earn a recall to the first team squad. Francis' replacement, teenager George Summers, scored six goals during the final months of the season.

League table

Results 
 Brentford's goal tally listed first.

Legend

Football League Third Division

FA Cup

Football League Cup 

 Sources: 100 Years Of Brentford, Statto

Playing squad 
 Players' ages are as of the opening day of the 1960–61 season.

 Sources: 100 Years Of Brentford, Timeless Bees

Coaching staff

Statistics

Appearances and goals 

 Players listed in italics left the club mid-season.
 Source: 100 Years Of Brentford

Goalscorers 

 Players listed in italics left the club mid-season.
 Source: 100 Years Of Brentford

Management

Summary

Transfers & loans

References 

Brentford F.C. seasons
Brentford